The Lemington Elementary School in the Lincoln-Lemington-Belmar neighborhood of Pittsburgh, Pennsylvania is a building from 1937. Portions of the exterior are ornamented with terracotta, and feature Mayan-inspired motifs such as an amber sunburst frieze and stylized human faces.   It was listed on the National Register of Historic Places in 1986.

References

Art Deco architecture in Pennsylvania
School buildings completed in 1937
Schools in Pittsburgh
School buildings on the National Register of Historic Places in Pennsylvania
City of Pittsburgh historic designations
Pittsburgh History & Landmarks Foundation Historic Landmarks
National Register of Historic Places in Pittsburgh